Anton is an unincorporated community located in Hopkins County, Kentucky, United States.

References

Unincorporated communities in Hopkins County, Kentucky
Unincorporated communities in Kentucky